The list of The George Washington School of Business people includes notable graduates, professors, and administrators affiliated with the School of Business at the George Washington University, located in Washington, D.C.

Alumni

Business 
James C. Boland – American businessman 
Nancy Davis – Chief investment officer and founder of Quadratic Capital Management 
Ric Duques (BBA, MBA) – former Chairman and CEO of First Data Corp.
 Pedro Heilbron (MBA) – CEO of Copa Holdings, S.A.
Kun-Hee Lee (MBA) – former Chairman and CEO, Samsung
Edward M. Liddy (MBA) – CEO of AIG; former Chairman and CEO, Allstate Corp.
Darla Moore (MBA) – Vice President, Rainwater Inc.; founder, Palmetto Institute 
Lowell C. Smith (MBA) – President, Nichols College
Kathy J. Warden (MBA) – President & CEO, Northrop Grumman.

Culture 
 Ina Garten (MBA) – Host of Barefoot Contessa
 Ellen Malcolm (MBA) – Founder and President, EMILY's List

Military 
 Peter Pace (MBA) – former Chairman of the Joint Chiefs of Staff
Arnold W. Braswell (MBA, 1967) - United States Air Force General
George W. Casey Sr. (MBA, 1965) - United States Army major general

Politics 
 Robin Bernstein (MBA, 1981) - American businesswoman and diplomat, current United States Ambassador to the Dominican Republic
Shahid Khaqan Abbasi (MBA) – Pakistan – Federal Minister of Petroleum, Government of Pakistan and CEO of Air Blue
Raya Haffar al-Hassan (MBA) – Finance Minister, Lebanon
Alaa Batayneh - Jordanian businessman and politician
Mel Carnahan (B.A., 1954) - American lawyer and politician and 51st Governor of Missouri
Kent Conrad (MBA) – United States Senator of North Dakota
Scott Cowen (MBA) – President, Tulane University
Randall Edwards (MBA) – Oregon State Treasurer
Faure Gnassingbe (MBA) – President of the Republic of Togo, 2005–present
Omar Ayub Khan (MBA) – former Pakistani Minister of State for Finance and current Federal Minister for Power
William Dale Montgomery (MBA)  former US Ambassador to Bulgaria
 Colin Powell (MBA) – former US Secretary of State and Chairman of the Joint Chiefs of Staff
 Sandiaga Uno (MBA) – current Minister of Tourism and Creative Economy of Indonesia; Vice Presidential Candidate in Indonesia's 2019 presidential election (defeated); former Deputy Governor of Jakarta; founder Saratoga Capital; 47th richest man in Indonesia in 2013

Sports 
Dina Al-Sabah (MBA) – Professional Figure Competitor
Patrick Tyrance (MBA) - Orthopedic surgeon and former Academic All American linebacker, for the Nebraska Cornhuskers football and picked by the Los Angeles Rams in the 1991 NFL draft

Faculty

Current 
Herman Aguinis - American researcher and professor of Organizational Behavior and Human Resource Management. Current Avram Tucker Distinguished Scholar and Professor of Management 
Tom Geurts -  Dutch economist and associate professor of Finance; Honorary Professor, Technical University of Berlin
Sanjay Jain - British economist and associate industry professor in the Department of Decision Sciences
Annamaria Lusardi - Denit Trust Distinguished Scholar and Professor of Economics and Accountancy, who also serves as the Academic Director of the Global Financial Literacy Excellence Center

Former 
Lowell C. Smith - American academic administrator and assistant professor of Business Administration

References 

George Washington University School of Business